Niukkala is a village in the municipality of Parikkala in the region of South Karelia, Finland, on the shore of Lake Pyhäjärvi.

The village belonged to Uukuniemi municipality until the beginning of 2005, when Uukuniemi was merged with Parikkala. Although the village was the former administrative center of the Uukuniemi municipality, it never formed an urban area due to the too small population base.

Niukkala's services include, for example, a general store, an Osuuspankki bank office, a sports field and a library.

References

External links
 Niukkala's location at Fonecta

Parikkala
Villages in Finland